Dominic Martin Vairo (November 2, 1913 – July 31, 2002) was an American football end for the Green Bay Packers of the National Football League (NFL). Vairo played college football for the University of Notre Dame before playing professionally in the NFL for one season and retired in 1935.

References

1913 births
Players of American football from Michigan
American football tight ends
Green Bay Packers players
People from Calumet, Michigan
2002 deaths
Notre Dame Fighting Irish football players